Cosmopolitan Shipping Company, also called the Cosmopolitan Line,  was founded in 1916 in New York City. Cosmopolitan Shipping Company operated cargoand passenger service from New York City to Le Havre France and Antwerp. From 1919 to 1939 operated United States Shipping Board ships under a United States contract, called the America-France Line. Later Cosmopolitan Shipping Company also operated the Southern Cross Line that served the east coast of South America. Southern Cross Line operated cargo ship with some passenger accommodations. 

In 1939 Cosmopolitan Shipping Company lost the America-France Line contract to Southgate Nelson Corporation. Southgate Nelson Corporation operated the Oriole Line and Hampton Roads-Yankee Line. In 1939 Cosmopolitan Shipping Company lost the Southern Cross Line to Westfal-Larsen & Company. Westfal-Larsen & Company also operated the Interocean Line and County Line. 

During World War II Cosmopolitan Shipping Company operated Merchant navy ships for the United States Shipping Board. During World War II Cosmopolitan Shipping Company was active with charter shipping with the Maritime Commission and War Shipping Administration.
Cosmopolitan Shipping Company operated Liberty ships for the merchant navy. The ship was run by its Cosmopolitan Shipping Company crew and the US Navy supplied United States Navy Armed Guards to man the deck guns and radio.

Granville Conway (1898–1969) departed the War Shipping Administration to head the Cosmopolitan Shipping Company in 1947.

Post war Cosmopolitan Shipping Company chartered Norway ships, rather American. In 1982 Cosmopolitan Shipping Company exited the shipping market.

Ships 
 Ships:
 Heron's Bridge, T2-SE-A1 tanker
 Eastern Crag
 Olen,  torpedo sank in 1941
 West Hematite,  torpedo sank in 1942 as SS Irish Pine
 SS West Eldara
 West Arrow, later called SS Black Osprey torpedoed and sunk in 1941
 Schodack, 1919 cargo, later called SS Alcoa Leader
 Halma, was sunk presumably by a mine off Nova Scotia July 1943
 Collamer, U-Boat sank in 1942
 William W. McKee

 Norwegian  ships:
  Heina
 Lista
 Ronda
 Hørda

 World War II ships:
 SS Barren Hill  T2 Tanker
 SS Horace H. Lurton
 Donald W. Bain
 Hilary A. Herbert
 Henry L. Benning
 Frederick W. Wood
 Wilson Victory
 Thomas W. Murray
 Edward B. Haines
 Mary Lyon
 John W. Powell
 Robert Battey
SS Junius Smith

See also 

 World War II United States Merchant Navy

References

External links 
 Liberty Ships built by the United States Maritime Commission in World War II

Transport companies established in 1919
Defunct shipping companies of the United States
1982 disestablishments in the United States
Transport companies disestablished in 1982